Wolfson Trailer House is a 1949 house designed by the pioneering modernist Marcel Breuer in Salt Point, New York, United States, and commissioned by Breuer's friend, the artist Sydney Wolfson. It is among the most distinctive of Breuer's residential designs, as Wolfson requested that Breuer integrate his 37-foot 1948 Spartan Royal Mansion trailer as one wing of the house, which Breuer initially resisted before agreeing to. The house features many Breuer hallmarks: cantilevered living space, central fireplace made of native stone, and natural wood finishes. The house sits on 20 acres of land abutting Wappinger Creek in Dutchess County north of New York City.

In 1950, a separate artist's studio was added to the property. Plans are underway by the current owners to add a third structure to the property, designed in dialogue with the original Breuer structure.

References 

 Henry Urbach, "Double Take," House and Garden, June 2006, pp. 170–176
Photos by François Dischinger, produced by Mayer Rus
Alison Serrell, At Home in the Hudson Valley, Chronicle Books, San Francisco, 2005, Photos by Meredith Heuer
Marcel Breuer Design and Architecture, Vitra Design Museum, Berlin and Weil am Rhein, 2003
p. 33 b/w period photo of south balcony. p. 307 full-page color image of cover of Echoes, no. 38-dining area and fireplace
Carol Newman, "Trailer Blazer," The World of Interiors, March 2003, pp. 110 – 117 Photos by Don Freeman
Carol Berens, "Modern Spaces: Outside the Box," Echoes, issue 38, January 2002, pp. 67–73, photos by Geoff Spear, Cover
Isabelle Hyman, Marcel Breuer, Architect, Abrams, 2001 Catalogue no. 190, plan and b/w photo by Ben Schnall
Marcel Breuer, American House, 2G, no. 17, 2001/1, p. 19, b/w by Ben Schnall
Joachim Driller, Breuer Houses, Phaidon, 2000, catalog no. 60, b/w by Ben Schnall
Jeff Dawson, "Trailer Blazing," Elle Decoration, no. 88, December 1999, pp. 88–95 Photos by Geoff Spear
Edward R. Ford, Details of Modern Architecture, vol. 2, 1928 - 1988, MIT, 1990 Chapter 5, pp. 162–163, plan and exploded drawing, photos by Ben Schnall
Cranston Jones, Marcel Breuer, 1921 - 1962, Praeger, 1962, p. 192
Ed, Peter Blake, Marcel Breuer: Sun and Shadow, Dodd, Mead & Co. NY, 1951 Fig. 84, photo by Ben Schnall, plans

Buildings and structures completed in 1949
Portable buildings and shelters
Buildings and structures in Dutchess County, New York